Blumengard Colony is a Hutterite colony and census-designated place (CDP) in Faulk County, South Dakota, United States. The population was 0 at the 2020 census. It was first listed as a CDP prior to the 2020 census.

It is on the northern edge of the county, bordered to the north by Edmunds County.

Demographics

References 

Census-designated places in Faulk County, South Dakota
Census-designated places in South Dakota
Hutterite communities in the United States